The Fort Hancock U.S. Life Saving Station, also known as Spermaceti Cove No. 2 Life-Saving Service Station, is located on Sandy Hook, north of Highlands, New Jersey. Originally built on the grounds of Fort Hancock, the area has been part of the Sandy Hook Unit of Gateway National Recreation Area since 1974.

A United States Life-Saving Service station was first located in the area in 1848 or 1849. The current structure was built in 1894 about 1,000 feet (305 m) from the 1848 site.  It is a -story shingle-style building with a boathouse and a four-story tower.  When the Life-Saving Service was merged into the United States Coast Guard in 1915, the site became a Coast Guard Station until decommissioned in 1949. It later served as administrative offices for a New Jersey state park, and, beginning in 1974, as a visitors' center for Gateway NRA.  It was added to the National Register of Historic Places on  November 30, 1981.

See also
National Register of Historic Places listings in Monmouth County, New Jersey

References

Government buildings on the National Register of Historic Places in New Jersey
Government buildings completed in 1894
Buildings and structures in Monmouth County, New Jersey
Highlands, New Jersey
Life-Saving Service stations
National Register of Historic Places in Monmouth County, New Jersey
New Jersey Register of Historic Places
Life-Saving Service stations on the National Register of Historic Places
1894 establishments in New Jersey